Van Ness–UDC station is an island platformed Washington Metro station serving the Forest Hills and North Cleveland Park neighborhoods of Washington, D.C., United States. The station was opened on December 5, 1981, and is operated by the Washington Metropolitan Area Transit Authority (WMATA). Providing service for the Red Line, the station is on the 4200 block of Connecticut Avenue Northwest, with exits on either side of Connecticut Avenue. The station is also close to the University of the District of Columbia (UDC), as well as to both Howard University School of Law and the Edmund Burke School.

Station layout 
Van Ness–UDC station is the northernmost station in the tunnel beneath Connecticut Avenue, one of Washington's busiest thoroughfares. After northbound trains leave the station, the tunnel shifts westwards underneath Yuma Street and at the next station, Tenleytown–AU, the tunnel then parallels the route of Wisconsin Avenue into Maryland.

Architecturally, Van Ness–UDC is similar to other stations along the underground stretch of the Red Line between Woodley Park and Medical Center. Because of the high cost of the four-coffer waffle design and the relative large depth of these stations, pre-fabricated concrete segments were shipped to the construction site and placed together to form the structure of the station. This resulted in what is now known as the "Arch I" station design of the Washington Metro.

Access to the station is provided by banks of escalators on either side of Connecticut Avenue, north of Veazey Terrace, which meet in an upper mezzanine and connect to a set of three long escalators to reach fare control. An elevator on the southwest corner of the intersection connects directly to the main mezzanine.

History
The station opened on December 5, 1981. It would serve as the northwestern terminus of the Red Line until the opening of an extension to the then-named Grosvenor station on August 25, 1984.

References

External links

Station entrances on Google Maps Street View

Forest Hills (Washington, D.C.)
Washington Metro stations in Washington, D.C.
Stations on the Red Line (Washington Metro)
Railway stations in the United States opened in 1981
Railway stations in Washington, D.C., at university and college campuses
1981 establishments in Washington, D.C.
Railway stations located underground in Washington, D.C.